Haw Branch is a historic house in Virginia. Haw Branch may also refer to:

Haw Branch (Cane Creek), a stream in Missouri
Haw Branch (Daviess County), a stream in Missouri